This is a list of all aircraft ever used by the United Kingdom. It consists of lists of what aircraft were in service for the UK at certain periods of time and by military force.

List of Army Air Corps aircraft
List of aircraft of the Army Air Corps (United Kingdom)

Aircraft of the Royal Flying Corps 

 List of aircraft of the Royal Flying Corps

Aircraft of the Royal Air Force 

 List of aircraft of the Royal Air Force

Aircraft of Royal Navy
List of naval aircraft of the United Kingdom
List of aircraft of the Royal Naval Air Service
List of aircraft of the Fleet Air Arm

World War II 

 List of aircraft of the United Kingdom in World War II

Modern day 

 List of active United Kingdom military aircraft

Gallery of  the progression of British fighters

References

Aircraft
Aircraft